Jerry Blackwell (April 26, 1949 – January 22, 1995) was an American professional wrestler, better known by his ring name "Crusher" Jerry Blackwell. Blackwell competed in the 1979 World's Strongest Man contest, but withdrew early in the competition due to an injury. He was a main event star in the American Wrestling Association where he feuded with Mad Dog Vachon, Hulk Hogan, The Crusher, Bruiser Brody and Sheik Adnan Al-Kaissey.

Professional wrestling career

Early career (1974–1979)
Nicknamed the "Mountain from Stone Mountain", "Crusher" Jerry Blackwell began his career in the 1970s. Despite his considerable bulk, Blackwell was quite nimble and a gifted worker, able to throw a standing dropkick and take bumps in the ring. In 1976, he wrestled in Pennsylvania, where he faced such wrestlers as Dominic DeNucci and Ivan Putski; in the latter match, he was disqualified for using brass knuckles against his opponent. He competed in the World Wide Wrestling Federation (WWWF) in 1978. He defeated such wrestlers as Larry Zbyszko, Dominic DeNucci and S.D. Jones but was unsuccessful in matches against high-profile stars such as André the Giant and WWF Champion Bob Backlund.

American Wrestling Association (1979–1989) 

In the 1980s, Blackwell settled in the AWA, where he became a main event star and feuded with Mad Dog Vachon, Hulk Hogan, and the "Crusher" Reginald Lisowski. Blackwell was tagged as the "Rattlesnake", given for his quick speed and aggression, a nickname which later in the 1990s was bestowed upon Steve Austin. After a bloody, unsuccessful feud with the Crusher, Blackwell dropped his "Crusher" moniker and eventually joined forces with hated AWA manager Sheik Adnan Al-Kaissey in 1983, wore Arab garments, and formed a successful tag team with Ken Patera known as the Sheiks. The Sheiks feuded with Verne Gagne, as well as the High Flyers (Greg Gagne and "Jumpin" Jim Brunzell) over the AWA world tag team title. The Sheiks beat the High Flyers for the tag team titles and remained champions for eleven months before being dethroned by the Crusher and Baron von Raschke.

Blackwell's career reached new heights after the departure of Hulk Hogan from the AWA in late 1983. Verne Gagne tapped Blackwell to be Hogan's replacement as the top babyface in the AWA. Blackwell became a face immediately after winning a battle-royal at the St. Paul Civic Center on June 10, 1984, when he was attacked and brutally triple-teamed by Al-Kaissey, Abdullah the Butcher and his tag team partner in Japan Bruiser Brody (billed as "King Kong Brody" in the AWA out of respect for Dick the Bruiser), which led to a post-match brawl also involving Dusty Rhodes, Curt Hennig and the Fabulous Ones (Steve Keirn and Stan Lane) coming in on Blackwell's behalf. Blackwell began a historic feud with Brody and Al-Kaissey, and established a new image as a solid fan favorite as well.

Blackwell went on to receive numerous title shots against AWA World Heavyweight champions Stan Hansen and Curt Hennig throughout 1986 and 1987; due to poor health caused by years of obesity and physical punishment, however, Blackwell's in-ring performance slowed. As a result, Blackwell stopped wrestling full-time. Blackwell made his last appearance in the AWA during a television taping in Rochester, Minnesota in October 1989, wrestling in a singles match against Tom Stone and in a 6-man tag team match with Bobby Fulton and Jackie Fulton against Johnny Valiant, Mike Enos, and Wayne Bloom. The AWA took the opportunity to push an angle between Blackwell and Adnan's new protégé Kokina Maximus, but the match never took place.

Blackwell considered joining the World Wrestling Federation (WWF) during the promotion's expansion in 1984. Before being signed, wrestlers were required to record promos, but the large number of wrestlers wanting to join the WWF made for a long lineup on a day while the interviews were being recorded. Blackwell got so frustrated with standing in line that he left, claiming that he was a wrestler and did not want to feel like he was punching a time clock for a corporation.

Reception and incidents
Blackwell was also known for his feats of strength. One of the most famous, which he performed during interviews, was diving into a 2x4.

While Blackwell was generally regarded as an easy wrestler to work with who was willing to sell his opponent's moves, he was involved in at least two matches in which his opponent was seriously injured. Mad Dog Vachon sustained three broken ribs and two broken vertebrae in a match with Blackwell and was unable to compete again for almost three years. The Crusher suffered nerve damage to his arm and was forced to take about a year off after Blackwell performed a move from the top rope and landed awkwardly on him.

Death
In later years, Blackwell suffered from health problems including diabetes, gangrene, and gout. He also suffered from personal losses, such as the death of his son, a subsequent divorce, and the loss of his business. Blackwell came close to death after kidney failure and pneumonia, and suffered several automobile accidents.

In December 1994, Blackwell was injured in another automobile accident, and died on January 22, 1995, at the age of 45, due to complications from injuries sustained from the accident.

Championships and accomplishments
American Wrestling Association
AWA World Tag Team Championship (1 time) – with Ken Patera
Central States Wrestling
NWA World Tag Team Championship (Central States version) (2 times) – with Buck Robley
Continental Wrestling Association
CWA Super Heavyweight Championship (1 time)
Southeastern Championship Wrestling
NWA Southeastern Tag Team Championship (2 times) – with The Invader (1), Dick Slater (1)
St. Louis Wrestling Club
NWA Missouri Heavyweight Championship (2 times)
Pro Wrestling Illustrated
PWI ranked him # 116 of the 500 best singles wrestlers during the "PWI Years" in 2003
PWI ranked him # 75 of the 100 best tag teams during the "PWI Years" – with Ken Patera in 2003

See also
 List of premature professional wrestling deaths

References

External links
 
 

1949 births
1995 deaths
20th-century American male actors
20th-century professional wrestlers
American male professional wrestlers
American strength athletes
AWA World Tag Team Champions
Professional wrestlers from Georgia (U.S. state)
Professional wrestling promoters
Road incident deaths in the United States